This is a list of dams and reservoirs in Spain by administrative division.

Andalusia

Aragon

Asturias

Balearic Islands

Basque Country

Canary Islands

Cantabria

Castile-La Mancha
Alarcón Dam
Entrepeñas Reservoir

Castile and León
Aldeadávila Dam
Almendra Dam
El Burguillo Reservoir
El Charco del Cura Reservoir
San Juan Reservoir
Saucelle Dam

Catalonia

Extremadura
Alcántara Dam
Arrocampo Reservoir
Cíjara Dam
García Sola Reservoir
La Serena Reservoir
Valdecañas reservoir
Zújar Reservoir

Galicia
Lake As Pontes

La Rioja

Madrid
El Atazar Dam
Navacerrada Dam
San Juan Reservoir

Region of Murcia

Region of Navarre

Valencian Community
Arenós Reservoir
Don Francisco Mira Cánovas Dam
Tibi Dam
Ulldecona Dam

See also 
List of dams and reservoirs
List of submerged places in Spain

Spain

Res
Dams in Spain